Macrochlamys amboinensis is a species of air-breathing land snail, a terrestrial pulmonate gastropod mollusk in the family Ariophantidae. The species has an extended mantle, the mantle collar, and caudal horn on the tail.

Distribution 
This species occurs in countries including:
 Vietnam
 Indonesia

Description

References

Further reading 

Ariophantidae
Gastropods described in 1864